History in the Making is rapper Gemini's third album. Gemini released this album under the name Big Geminii instead of Gemini.

Track listing

References

2008 albums
Gemini (rapper) albums